Thessalonians (also known as PGR/Thessalonians) were a San Francisco-based electronic music group founded by Kim Cascone and Larry Thrasher. Originally, their compositions focused on infusing drone and experimental music and later integrated elements of ambient, industrial and psychedelic music. Their final line-up was Cascone, Thrasher, Don Falcone, and Paul Neyrinck.

History
Thessalonians were formed as a collaborative project in 1986 by keyboardist Kim Cascone and percussionist Larry Thrasher. 
They were joined by David Gardner, David James and Kurt Robinson to form a quintet. This line-up released four albums, three under the name PGR/Thessalonians (the former being the name of an ambient music project by Cascone). Two of the albums were released by Silent Records, the label run by Cascone. The last release by this line-up was the PGR/Thessalonian album The Black Field.

In 1990, Cascone, Thrasher, and James were joined by Don Falcone on synthesizer, Doug Murdock on percussion, and Paul Neyrinck on sampler. They recorded the 1993 album Soulcraft for Silent. In 1996, Thessalonians disbanded and Cascone sold Silent.

Twelve years after their previous album, the band released Solaristics, which comprised music recorded by Cascone, Falcone, Neyrinck, and Thrasher between 1992 and 1996.

Members

Final line-up
 Kim Cascone
 Don Falcone
 Paul Neyrinck
 Larry Thrasher

Previous members
 David Gardner
 Pejman Hakimi
 David James
 Doug Murdock
 Kurt Robinson

Discography
Studio albums
 PGR/Thessalonians: The Concentration of Light Prior to Combustion (1986, Banned)
 Thessalonians: The Unwinding (1986, Silent)
 PGR/Thessalonians: Imbrication 2: An Investigaton Into Documenting Change Systems (1988, Angakok)
 PGR/Thessalonians: The Black Field (1989, Silent) 
 Thessalonians: Soulcraft (1993, Silent)
 Thessalonians: Solaristics (2005, Noh Poetry)

References

External links 
 Thessalonians at Bandcamp
 
 

Musical groups established in 1986
Musical groups disestablished in 1996
1986 establishments in California
Musical groups from San Francisco
American ambient music groups
American industrial music groups
American electronic music groups
Psychedelic rock music groups from California
Drone music groups